Hemithraupis is a small genus of passerine birds in the tanager family Thraupidae found in the forests of South America.

Taxonomy and species list
The genus Hemithraupis was introduced in 1851 by the German ornithologist Jean Cabanis with the rufous-headed tanager as the type species. The genus name combines the Ancient Greek hēmi meaning "half" or "small" with thraupis, an unknown small bird. In ornithology thraupis is used to denote a tanager.

References

 
Bird genera